Antonio Escobar may refer to:

Antonio Escobar y Mendoza (1589–1669), Spanish ethicist
Antonio Escobar Núñez (born 1976), Spanish musician
Antonio Escobar Huertas (1879–1940), Spanish general
Antonio Escobar (actor), on telenovelas such as Dulce desafío